The conquest of Santarém took place on 15 March 1147, when the troops of the Kingdom of Portugal under the leadership of Afonso I of Portugal captured the Almoravid city of Santarém (at the time called Shantarin).

Prelude
On 10 March 1147, King Afonso I of Portugal departed from Coimbra with 250 of his best knights intending to capture the Moorish city of Santarém, a goal that he had previously failed to achieve. The conquest of Santarém was of vital importance to Afonso's strategy; its possession would mean the end of the frequent Moorish attacks on Leiria and would also allow a future attack on Lisbon.

The plan now was to attack the city during the night under cover of darkness, in order to catch the Moorish garrison by surprise. King Afonso had previously sent the Portuguese Mem Ramires to Santarém disguised as a businessman, in order to secretly study the city for the conquest.

After the first day of the journey from Coimbra to Santarém, King Afonso I sent an emissary to Santarém announcing to the Moors that the truce had ended, for which three days' notice was required.

Fall of Santarém
On the night of 14 March, King Afonso and his army arrived at Santarém and hid ladders in the fields. Before dawn the next morning, 25 knights scaled the walls, killed the Moorish sentries and forced their way to the gate, allowing the main Portuguese army to enter the city. Awakened by the screams of their sentries, the Moors ran from all sides to face the Portuguese attackers in the streets, offering very strong resistance, but ended up being defeated and slaughtered.

By morning the conquest was already complete and Santarém became part of the recently formed Kingdom of Portugal.

Aftermath
After the conquest of Santarém, Afonso I of Portugal turned his attention to the important Moorish city of Lisbon, which he would conquer in October with the help of a crusader fleet of the Second Crusade who stopped in Portugal while on course to the Holy Land.

The earliest and most detailed source for the conquest of Santarém is the De expugnatione Scalabis.

See also
Siege of Santarém (1184)

Notes

References

H. V. Livermore, A new history of Portugal (Cambridge University Press, 1976) 
Ângelo Ribeiro, A Formação do Território-Da Lusitânia ao Alargamento do País (2004) 
 See esp. pp. 7–23.

Santarém
Santarém
Santarém
Santarém
Santarém
Santarém
Santarém
Santarém